Elizabeth Alice Austen (March 17, 1866 – June 9, 1952) was an American photographer working in Staten Island.

Biography
Alice Austen was born in 1866 to Alice Cornell Austen and Edward Stopford Munn.  Austen's father abandoned the family around 1869. Her great great grandfather, Peter Townsend, was the owner of Sterling Iron Works famous for forging the Hudson River Chain used to thwart British ships during the American Revolutionary War.

Austen was introduced to photography at age 10 in 1876. A second-floor closet of her home on the shoreline of the New York Narrows Harbor served as her darkroom. In this home studio, which was also one of her photographic muses, she produced over 7,000 photographs of a rapidly changing New York City, making significant contributions to photographic history, documenting New York's immigrant populations, Victorian women's social activities, and the natural and architectural world of her travels.

One of America's first female photographers to work outside of the studio, Austen often transported up to 50 pounds of photographic equipment on her bicycle to capture her world. Her photographs represent street and private life through the lens of a lesbian woman whose life spanned from 1866 to 1952. Austen was a rebel who broke away from the constraints of her Victorian environment and forged an independent life that broke boundaries of acceptable female behavior and social rules.

Austen was independently wealthy for most of her life and has widely been considered an amateur photographer because she did not make her living from photography. However, in addition to completing a paid assignment documenting the people and conditions of immigrant quarantine stations in New York during the 1890s, Austen copyrighted, exhibited and published her work.

Alice Austen's life and relationships with other women are crucial to an understanding of her work. Until very recently many interpretations of Austen's work overlooked her intimate relationships. What is especially significant about Austen's photographs is that they provide rare documentation of intimate relationships between Victorian women. Her non-traditional lifestyle and that of her friends, although intended for private viewing, is the subject of some of her most critically acclaimed photographs. Austen would spend 53 years in a devoted loving relationship with Gertrude Tate, 30 years of which were spent living together in her home which is now the site of the Alice Austen House Museum and a nationally designated site of LGBTQ history.

Austen's wealth was lost in the stock market crash of 1929 and she and Tate were evicted from their beloved home in 1945. Tate and Austen were finally separated by family rejection of their relationship and poverty. Austen was moved to the Staten Island Farm Colony where Tate would visit her weekly. In 1951 Austen's photographs were rediscovered by historian Oliver Jensen and money was raised by the publication of her photographs to place Austen in private nursing home care. On June 9, 1952 Austen passed away. The final wishes of Austen and Tate to be buried together were denied by their families.

Timeline
1866: Birth and baptism
1876: Begins photographing
1899: Meets Gertrude Tate
1917: Gertrude Tate moves in
1929: Stock market crash
1945: Evicted from home
1950: Declared a pauper then her rediscovery
1951: Alice Austen day
1952: Death
1976: Clear Comfort becomes National Landmark
2017: Landmark Designation Amended to include LGBTQ history as an area of significance

Legacy
The Alice Austen School, PS 60, located on Merril Avenue in the Bulls Head neighborhood of Staten Island, is named in her honor as is a Staten Island Ferry boat.
Playwright Robin Rice's drama Alice in Black and White traces Austen's life from 1876 to 1951. The play also follows Oliver Jensen's search for and discovery of Austen and her glass plate negatives. The play received its world premiere at the Kentucky Center followed by a New York City premiere at 59E59 Theaters in 2016, the 150th anniversary of Austen's birth. (Both productions with Looking for Lilith Theatre Company). The play won the StageWrite Women's Theatre Initiative Award.
Her life and work inspired the fiction book Alice Austen Lived Here by Alex Gino, in which two non-binary middle schoolers do a US History report about Austen.

Gallery

References

Further reading
Austen, Alice: Street Types of New York. New York:  The Albertype Company, 1896; facsimile reprint, Staten Island, N.Y; Friends of Alice Austen House, 1994
New York Times, October 6, 1951, page 12; "Alice Austen Day"

‘The Newly Discovered Picture World of Alice Austen: Great Woman Photographer Steps Out of the Past’, Life (24 Sept 1951), pp. 137–44
 Gerhard Bissell, Austen, Alice, in: Allgemeines Künstlerlexikon (Artists of the World), Suppl. I, Saur, Munich 2005, p. 541 (in German). 
Buckwalter, Margaret: Alice Austen:  Commemorative Journal: Alice Austen Museum, 1986 
Grover, C. Jane:  The Positive Image:  Women Photographers in Turn-of-the-Century America: State University of New York Press, 1988.  
Hammer, Barbara:  The Female Closet (A look at the art and lives of Alice Austen, Hannah Höch and Nicole Eisenman) Video, 1998
Humphreys, Hugh Campbell:  Gateway to America:  The Alice Austen House and Esplanade. New York:  Friends of The Alice Austen House, 1968 (A proposal to restore and preserve the Alice Austen house and former New York Yacht Club on Staten Island, and to create a park and a museum)
H. Humphries and R. Benedict: ‘The Friends of Alice Austen: With a Portfolio of Historical Photographs’, Infinity (July 1967), pp. 4–31
Jensen, Oliver: The Revolt of American Women; a Pictorial History of the Century of Change from Bloomers to Bikinis-from Feminism to Freud: Harcourt Brace Jovanovich, 1971.  
Kaplan, Daile: Fine Day: The Exhibition Featuring Photographs By Alice Austen Frank Eugene Gertrude Kasebier and Others: Alice Austen House & Staten Island Historical Society, 1988 (exhibition catalog)
Khoudari, Amy S.; Alice Austen House:  A National Historic Landmark, Museum & Garden Guide. Staten Island: Friends of Alice Austen House, c1993
S. Khoudari: Looking the Shadows: The Life and Photography of Alice Austen (diss., New York, Sarah Lawrence College, 1993)
M. Kreisel: American Women Photographers: A Selected and Annotated Bibliography (Westport and London, 1999)
Lenman, Robin: The Oxford Companion to Photography: Oxford University Press, 2005.  
Lynch, Annette and Katalin Medvedev (editors): Fashion, Agency, and Empowerment: Performing Agency, Following Script:  London/New York: Bloomsbury Visual Arts, 2019.  
Novotny, Ann. Alice's World: The Life and Photography of an American Original: Alice Austen, 1866-1952. Old Greenwich, Conn.: Chatham Press, 1976.
Novotny, Ann. "Alice Austen's World." In Heresies: A Feminist Publication on Art and Politics 1, no. 3 (Fall 1977): 27–33.
Rist, Darrell Yates. "Alice Austen House: A Gay Haven on Staten Island is Reclaimed." The Advocate, no. 438 (21 January 1986): 38–39.
J. L. Roscio: Unpacking a Victorian Woman: Alice Austen and Photography of the Cult of Domesticity in Nineteenth Century America (diss., Buffalo, NY, State U., 2005)
Rosenblum, Naomi. A History of Women Photographers. New York: Abbeville, 2014. .
Simpson, Jeffrey:  The Way Life Was. A Photographic Treasury from the American Past by Chansonetta Emmons, Frances Benjamin Johnston, Alice Austen, Jacob Riis, The Byrons, Lewis Hine, Henry Hamilton Bennett, Solomon Butcher, L.W. Halbe, Joseph Pennell, E.J. Bellocq, Erwin Smith, Adam Vroman, Edward Curtis, Arnold Genthe and Darius Kinsey: New York/Washington Chanticleer Press/Praeger, 1975 
Wexler, Laura: Tender Violence:  Domestic Visions in an Age of U.S. Imperialism. Chapel Hill: University of North Carolina Press, 2000, 
Woods, Mary N.: Beyond the Architect's Eye: Photographs and the American Built Environment: Philadelphia: University of Pennsylvania Press, 2009.  
Zimmerman, Bonnie (editor):  Lesbian Histories and Cultures:  An Encyclopedia, Volume 1: New York/London: Garland Publishing, Inc. 2000.

External links
Official Alice Austen Website
Selected Austen images in the Staten Island Historical Society Online Collections Database
Findagrave: Alice Austen
Alice Austen Recognized as LGBTQ Icon
Alice Austen House NYC LGBT Historic Sites Project
Clear Comfort National Park Service
Whitney Museum of American Art Panel Discussion: Alice Austen House: New Eyes on Alice Austen

1866 births
1952 deaths
Photographers from New York City
People from Staten Island
American women photographers
American LGBT photographers
Cornell family
American people of English descent
Burials at Moravian Cemetery
American lesbian artists